The 2021–22 America East Conference men's basketball season started non-conference play on November 9, 2021, and began conference play on January 2, 2022. The regular season ended on March 1, 2022, followed by the 2022 America East men's basketball tournament held March 6–12, 2022. The Vermont Catamounts finished atop conference standings and also won the conference tournament.

Conference Schedule 
Each team is scheduled to play 18 conference games. Each team will play every team twice, once at home and once on the road.

Head Coaches

Coach Changes 
Albany hired Dwayne Killings after Will Brown left to become head coach and general manager of the Albany Patroons.

Binghamton named Levell Sanders interim head coach after Tommy Dempsey's contract was not renewed.

UMBC hired Jim Ferry after Ryan Odom left to become the head coach at Utah State.

Coaches 

Notes:

 Year at school includes 2021–22 season.
 Overall and America East records are from the time at current school and are through the end of the 2020–21 season.
 NCAA Tournament appearances are from the time at current school only.
*Interim Head Coach for 2021-22 Season

Preseason Awards 
The Preseason America East Conference men's basketball polls was released on October 21, 2021.

Preseason men's basketball poll 
First Place Votes in Parenthesis

 Stony Brook (5) - 77
 Vermont (4) - 71
 New Hampshire (1) - 64
 Hartford - 56
 UMBC - 49
 UMass Lowell - 43
 Albany - 34
 NJIT - 23
 Maine - 16
 Binghamton - 14

Preseason Honors

Regular season

Conference standings

Conference Matrix

Players of the Week

Records against other conferences

Conference tournament 

The top 8 teams from the America East qualify for the conference tournament. The higher seed hosts each game.

References